Ruisdael or Ruysdael is a Dutch surname. Notable persons with that name include:

 Jacob Isaackszoon van Ruisdael ( 1629–1682), Dutch Golden Age landscape painter, best-known of his family
 Salomon van Ruysdael ( 1602–1670), Dutch Golden Age landscape painter, uncle of Jacob and second-best known of the family
 Jacob Salomonszoon van Ruysdael (1629–1681), Dutch Golden Age landscape painter, cousin of Jacob and often confused with him
 Isaack van Ruisdael (1599–1677), Dutch Golden Age landscape painter, father of Jacob (few works known)